The Potpourri, a weekly newspaper, covers the communities of Tomball and Magnolia, which are located north west of Houston, Texas. The publication publishes separate editions for each community. The communities are neighbors and span two counties: Harris and Montgomery counties. The publications have weekly circulations of more than 31,500 and have a current estimated readership of 90,000. The broadsheet publication is distributed free every Wednesday. The Potpourri is in its 45th year. The publication has had various owners throughout that time and began as a place mat featuring community news in restaurants.

It was owned by ASP Westward LP until 2012, when it was acquired by 1013 Star Communications as part of its acquisition of Houston Community Newspapers. In 2016, the Hearst Corporation acquired Houston Community Newspapers; it is the parent company of the Houston Chronicle. As part of the deal the Potpourri became a part of the Hearst Corporation.

References

External links
The Magnolia Potpourri
The Tomball Potpourri

Newspapers published in Greater Houston
Harris County, Texas
Montgomery County, Texas
Hearst Communications publications
Weekly newspapers published in Texas